Nicrophorus nigrita is a burying beetle described by Mannerheim in 1843.

References
data

Silphidae
Beetles of North America
Beetles described in 1843
Taxa named by Carl Gustaf Mannerheim (naturalist)